Miss Universe Botswana is a beauty pageant that was first held in 1999, with winner competing in the Miss Universe pageant.

History

1999–2004 
The first ever Miss Universe Botswana pageant was held at the Grand Palm Hotel Casino Resort in the capital of Gaborone on the March 19, 1999. In 1999 Mpule Kwelagobe became the 3rd woman from Africa who was crowned Miss Universe pageant. Between 2002 and 2003 the country did not participate in Miss Universe but in 2004 the country sent a winning title of Miss Universe Botswana to Ecuador, Miss Universe 2004.

2010–2013
In 2010, Mos Syde Worldwide Entertainment Group; an international entertainment and fashion company domiciled in Botswana and took over the Miss Universe Botswana pageant after a six-year absence in Miss Universe. Tirelo Ramasedi was crowned Miss Universe Botswana 2010 during an event held in Gaborone on July 11. She represented Botswana at Miss Universe 2010 in Las Vegas on August 23. The follow-up winners were Larona Kgabo (2011), Sheillah Molelekwa (2012), and Tsoane Macheng (2013). 2013 was the last time Botswana participated in Miss Universe. Safie Sekgwa is the National Director.

2019 rumor
After rumors that Mpule Kwelagobe took over the Miss Universe Botswana franchise in 2019, Kwelagobe denied the allegations. "This is not true. I do not know who has been spreading these fake reports, but I am not the franchise holder of Miss Universe and I do not have any interest whatsoever in doing so,".

Titleholders

The winner of Miss Universe Botswana represents the country at the Miss Universe pageant. On occasion, when the winner does not qualify (due to age) a runner-up is sent.

See also
 Miss Universe

References

External links
Official site 

Botswana
Botswana
Recurring events established in 1999
1999 establishments in Botswana
Botswana awards